Ned Bell (born June 12) is a Canadian television personality and executive chef. He appeared on Cook Like a Chef, Its Just Food and on Global B.C. Weekend Monday News Saturday Chef segment.

Early life
Born on June 12 in Okanagan British Columbia, at the age of 12 Bell would cook for his younger siblings and that is what kick started his love for food and cooking. When he turned 15 he got his first job washing dishes. In 1991 he graduated high school from Magee Secondary School. Then he went on to culinary school at Durbrulle French Culinary School and graduated in 1994.

Career
After graduating college, Bell followed his instructor Rob Feenie and worked at Crocodile and later helped him open a restaurant called Lumiere. Bell became the sous chef of the restaurant alongside of Michael Jacob. He was awarded "Best Over All Rising Star" from Where (magazine) after opening Murrietas Grill in Calgary. In 2007 Bell returned home to become the co-owner and chef at the Kelowna lakeside, Cabana Bar and Grill where he soon ranked one of Western Living Magazines "Top 40 Foodies Under 20". Bell moved on to work at the Four Seasons Hotel under  YEW Kitchen. The restaurant launched a new sustainable seafood concept in 2011 and Bell was a full supporter. With his first year of working at the Four Seasons, Bell became responsible for bringing the hotel into a "New Era". Guest covers, restaurant sales and catering revenue grew by 30 percent.

Television
Bell also hosts and makes appearances on a few television shows. Its Just Food! is a show for cooks to learn techniques and different meals. From main dishes, side dishes and even desserts Bell and his co-host Julie Van Rosendale show at-home chefs back-to-basic examples and demonstrate the cooking basics. Cook Like a Chef was another show Ned made appearances on, which a studio-based television show that shows people how to cook, not what to cook. Chefs on this show focus on cooking tips and skills. Another show he appears on is Global BC Weekend Morning News chef segments.

In 2018, Bell competed on the second episode of Iron Chef Canada in which he battled his former mentor Rob Feenie in a battle of stone fruit.

Awards
"Best over all up coming star" by Where Magazine after opening Murrieta's Grille in Calgary.
"Top 40 Foodies Under 20" by Western Living magazine after becoming the co-owner and chef at Cabana Bar and Grille in Kelowna.

Personal life
Bell is a father of three sons, Fin, Max and Jet. He's married to publicist Kate Colley. He is very passionate about creating globally inspired dishes using local ingredients with a large emphasis on sustainable seafood. Besides cooking he spends his free time with his family, cycling, golfing and running.

References

Canadian television chefs
Living people
Year of birth missing (living people)
Canadian male chefs